Howe of Fife RFC is a rugby union club based in Cupar, Fife, Scotland. It was founded in 1921, and they play in blue and white hoops.

History

Previously, the club had two undefeated seasons in 2007 and 2008, earning them rights to promotion. The 1st XV are currently coached by Gavin Emerson. The captain is Jamie Thomson. The Howe run teams from Primary 3 level up to under-18 colts level. Many players have gone on to represent Fife, Caledonia, and Scotland at age grade level, with a handful going on to represent professional clubs. In 2007, current first XV Captain Chris Mason led the under-18 Howe of Fife squad to a unique treble winning both the school (as Bell Baxter High School) and the Club Scottish cups as well as the Scottish schools sevens cup. A number of the players involved in that team now play for the senior side.

Howe Harlequins are the 1st XV Women's team, founded in 2014. The Duffus Park-based club have barely been in existence a few years but have been making massive strides in the women's game. In 2017, they won the BT National Division 2 Championship which promoted them into National 1. With the recent changes to the women's league names, they now start the 2018 season in the Tennent's Women's National League 1. The Harlequins originally got together as a way for women to keep fit through rugby. But with a competitive spirit growing, added to a developing skillset, the side started to play matches against other teams. Since then, the Harlequins haven't looked back. President Murdo Fraser paid tribute to the side after their title win. "Our women's team have shown that anything is possible and we are all very proud of the team and what they have achieved", he said at the time.

In 2017 and 2018, the club was associated with the commemorations of the Battles of the Somme and Arras, including the Eric Milroy commemorative tournament. These Franco-Scottish events gave birth in February 2018 to the creation of the Auld Alliance Trophy, played every year as part of the six nations tournament.

Suspensions
In November 2017 several of the club's 1st XV men's team received 347 total weeks of suspension for incidents that took place the previous year in which a new player was sexually assaulted by having a bottle inserted into their anus after a match.

Howe of Fife Sevens

The club run the Howe of Fife Sevens tournament.

Honours

Men

 Howe of Fife Sevens
 Champions: 1975, 1977, 1986, 1990, 2013, 2014, 2016, 2017
 Stirling Sevens
 Champions: 1956, 1958, 1987, 2012
 Highland Sevens
 Champions: 1957
 Clarkston Sevens
 Champions: 1963
 Waid Academy F.P. Sevens
 Champions: 1957, 1958, 1960, 1968, 1974, 1975, 1977, 1996
 Moray Sevens
 Champions: 1959, 1987
 Haddington Sevens
 Champions: 2017
 Midlands District Sevens
 Champions: 1949, 1957, 1959, 1983, 1987
 Perthshire Sevens
 Champions: 2015
 Kirkcaldy Sevens
 Champions: 1950, 1956, 1957, 1982
 Hamilton Sevens
 Champions: 2013, 2014, 2015
 Scottish National League Division Two
 Champions (1): 2011–12
 Runners-up (3): 2012–13, 2013–14, 2014–15
 Scottish National League Division Three
 Champions (1): 2009–10

Women

 Dundee City Sevens
 Champions (2): 2021, 2022

Notable players and personnel
 Cameron Glasgow/Cammy Glasgow
 Gordon Hamilton  flanker, scored against  in 1991 Rugby World Cup
 Tom Pearson, president of the Scottish Rugby Union, 1988–1989
 David Whyte, 13 caps for Scotland, played for Howe during his youth.
 Charlie Drummond, Scotland cap, president of the SRU 1974–1975.
 Dougie McMahon, international referee 1960–1969
 John Howard Wilson, capped for Scotland in 1953.
 Ian Kirkhope
 HL Stewart, played cricket for Scotland.
 Bob Steven, 
 Fergus Thomson, Glasgow Warriors capped for Scotland A and 
 Michael Fedo, Scotland sevens international
 George Horne, Glasgow Warriors, Scotland sevens international and 
 Jamie Ritchie, Edinburgh Rugby and 
 Cameron Fenton, Glasgow Warriors and Edinburgh Rugby
 Matt Fagerson, Glasgow Warriors and

References

Sources

 Massie, Allan A Portrait of Scottish Rugby (Polygon, Edinburgh)

External links
 
 Howe of Fife Rugby Club and supporters
 https://www.fifetoday.co.uk/sport/fife-rugby-club-helps-launch-new-trophy-marking-auld-alliance-links-1047053
 :fr:Troph%C3%A9e Auld Alliance

Scottish rugby union teams
Rugby union in Fife
Rugby clubs established in 1921
Cupar
1921 establishments in Scotland